Vibeke is a Scandinavian female given name, and may refer to:

Vibeke Falk (1918–2011), Norwegian actress.
Hanne-Vibeke Holst (born 1959), Danish author
Vibeke Hammer Madsen (born 1955), Norwegian businessperson
Vibeke Hastrup (born 1958), Danish actress who has worked in theatre, television and film
Vibeke Johansen (born 1978), Olympic and National Record holding swimmer from Norway
Vibeke Johnsen (born 1968), Norwegian team handball player and Olympic medalist
Vibeke Karlsen (born 1967), Norwegian football referee
Vibeke Kruse (died 1648), official mistress of King Christian IV of Denmark between 1629 and 1648
Vibeke Løkkeberg (born 1945), Norwegian film actress and director
Vibeke Lunde (1921–1962), Norwegian sailor and Olympic medalist
Vibeke Møller (1904–1987), Danish freestyle swimmer who competed in the 1924 Summer Olympics
Vibeke Roggen (born 1952), Norwegian philologist and translator
Vibeke Skofterud (1980–2018), Norwegian cross country skier who had been competing since 1999
Vibeke Sperling, (1945–2017), Danish journalist
Vibeke Stene (born 1978), Norwegian soprano singer
Vibeke Storm Rasmussen (born 1945), Danish politician and the current chairman of the Capital Region of Denmark, elected for the Social Democrats
Vibeke Vasbo (born 1944), Danish writer and women's rights and LGBT rights activist
Vibeke Windeløv (born 1950), Danish film producer

See also
2414 Vibeke, a main belt asteroid with an orbital period of 2090

Danish feminine given names
Norwegian feminine given names